He Who Gets Slapped is a 1915 play by Leonid Andreyev.

Adaptations of that play include:
 He Who Gets Slapped (film), a 1924 silent film by Victor Sjöström
 He Who Gets Slapped (opera), a 1956 opera by Robert Ward